Algebra is one of the main branches of mathematics, covering the study of structure, relation and quantity. Algebra studies the effects of adding and multiplying numbers, variables, and polynomials, along with their factorization and determining their roots. In addition to working directly with numbers, algebra also covers symbols, variables, and set elements. Addition and multiplication are general operations, but their precise definitions lead to structures such as groups, rings, and fields.

Branches
 Pre-algebra
 Elementary algebra
 Abstract algebra
 Linear algebra
 Universal algebra

Algebraic equations 

An algebraic equation is an equation involving only algebraic expressions in the unknowns. These are further classified by degree.

 Linear equation – algebraic equation of degree one.
 Polynomial equation – equation in which a polynomial is set equal to another polynomial.
 Transcendental equation – equation involving a transcendental function of one of its variables.
 Functional equation – equation in which the unknowns are functions rather than simple quantities.
 Differential equation – equation involving derivatives.
 Integral equation – equation involving integrals.
 Diophantine equation – equation where the only solutions of interest of the unknowns are the integer ones.

History

 History of algebra

General algebra concepts
 Fundamental theorem of algebra – states that every non-constant single-variable polynomial with complex coefficients has at least one complex root. This includes polynomials with real coefficients, since every real number is a complex number with an imaginary part equal to zero.
Equations – equality of two mathematical expressions
 Linear equation – an algebraic equation with a degree of one
 Quadratic equation – an algebraic equation with a degree of two
 Cubic equation – an algebraic equation with a degree of three
 Quartic equation – an algebraic equation with a degree of four
 Quintic equation – an algebraic equation with a degree of five
 Polynomial – an algebraic expression consisting of variables and coefficients
Inequalities – a comparison between values
Functions – mapping that associates a single output value with each input value
Sequences – ordered list of elements either finite or infinite
Systems of equations – finite set of equations
Vectors – element of a vector space
Matrix – two dimensional array of numbers
Vector space – basic algebraic structure of linear algebra
Field – algebraic structure with addition, multiplication and division
Groups – algebraic structure with a single binary operation
Rings – algebraic structure with addition and multiplication

See also

 Table of mathematical symbols

External links
'4000 Years of Algebra', lecture by Robin Wilson, at Gresham College, 17 October 2007 (available for MP3 and MP4 download, as well as a text file).
 ExampleProblems.com Example problems and solutions from basic and abstract algebra.

 List
Algebra
Algebra
Algebra